Fred Cook may refer to:
 Fred Cook (American football) (born 1952), American football player for the Baltimore Colts
 Fred Cook (Australian footballer, born 1922) (1922–1984), Australian rules footballer who played with the Richmond Football Club
 Fred Cook (Australian footballer, born 1947), Australian rules footballer who played with Footscray and Port Melbourne
 Fred Cook (footballer, born 1880) (1880–1934), English goalkeeper for Northampton Town, West Bromwich Albion and Portsmouth, fl. 1900s
 Fred Cook (politician) (1858–1943), mayor of Ottawa
 Fred Cook (Welsh footballer) (1902–1966), Wales international footballer
 Fred J. Cook (1911–2003), American investigative journalist
 Bun Cook (1903–1988), real name Fred Cook, ice hockey player

See also
 Frederick Cook (disambiguation)